David Baird (4 March 1869 – 19 March 1946) was a Scottish footballer who played for Heart of Midlothian, Motherwell and Scotland. Baird won the Scottish Cup three times with Hearts, playing in three different positions in each of the finals (1891, 1896 and 1901), though he was most commonly deployed as an outside forward. After retiring as a player in 1904, Baird was a director of Hearts between 1926 and 1936.

References

Sources

External links

1869 births
1946 deaths
Scottish footballers
Scotland international footballers
St Bernard's F.C. players
Heart of Midlothian F.C. players
Motherwell F.C. players
Association football outside forwards
Footballers from Edinburgh
Scottish Football League players
Scottish Football League representative players
Directors of football clubs in Scotland